The 1965 Mr. Olympia bodybuilding competition was the first ever held after its creation by Joe Weider. The competition was staged on September 18, 1965, at the Brooklyn Academy of Music in New York City.

Results

References

External links 
 Mr. Olympia

 1965
1965 in American sports
1965 in bodybuilding